Ashern (Canada 2016 Census population 565) is an unincorporated community recognized as a local urban district located in the Municipality of West Interlake in Manitoba's Interlake Region. The RM of Siglunes was incorporated in 1917. Ashern was named after A. S. Hern, a timekeeper of the firm that constructed the railway that served the Western Interlake.

Today the municipality supports the agriculture (mostly beef in addition to a few private pork and chicken farms), fishing, mineral extraction, recreation and tourism industries. The community of Ashern is the largest community in the RM and is a regional service centre to a trading area of approximately 8,000 people.

Demographics 

Activities 
During the winter months, there are various sports to partake in: hockey, curling, figure skating, ringette, snowmobiling, ice-fishing and cross country skiing. Different levels of most team sports exist to accommodate the wide range of ages that play on them. Ashern has an indoor skating rink and a curling rink, both with artificial ice. Summer sports include baseball, water sports, swimming, and other games such as horseshoes. Ashern has a nine-hole golf course with grass greens, watered fairways and a licensed clubhouse.

Ashern has a community hall, an Elk's Hall and a Royal Canadian Legion Hall that cater to a wide variety of events and community groups. Wedding socials, bingos, dances, and Christmas concerts are some of the things that go on throughout the year.

The local beaches boast fine sand and clear, clean water. Lake Manitoba Narrows Lodge and Silver Bay are popular places for local cottage owners and seasonal campers. These areas are privately owned, although camping is available by reservation for the Lake Manitoba Narrows Lodge. Lake Manitoba has many sand bars which are ideal for children.

The Ashern Museum is open during the summer months and contains several buildings which house pioneer displays and artifacts.

The fall months are welcomed by avid hunters as the Siglunes region is a hunter's paradise. It hosts the Annual Ashern Rodeo during the Labour Day weekend. A street dance, fireworks, parade, rodeo and social are also a part of Labour Day Weekend in Ashern, as well as the Ashern Horse Show. The Ashern Hornets is the hockey team that plays in the SIHL (South Interlake Hockey League). Ashern is the hometown of the former NHL player Chuck Arnason as well as actor Adam Beach. Ashern is about two hours north of Winnipeg. The (Grade 5-12) high school is the largest in the division.  It also has an elementary school (Kindergarten- Grade 4), recently built daycare, and a hospital serving the region.

Climate
Ashern has a humid continental climate (Köppen Dfb) with warm summers and very cold winters. Due to its position far from large moderating bodies of water and its quite high latitude Ashern see extreme temperature variation over the course of the year.

World's largest sharptail grouse 
Ashern is home the world's largest sharptail grouse. It was constructed to commemorate "One Box Hunt", held in the area, that was the world's premiere sharptail hunt.

Notable people
Chuck Arnason, former professional hockey player
Adam Beach, Actor

In film
 The 1982 National Film Board film, The Pedlar, was shot in town.

References

Designated places in Manitoba
Local urban districts in Manitoba